Michael Gregor may refer to:

 Michael Gregor (aircraft engineer) (1888–1953), aircraft engineer of Georgian origin
 Michael Gregor (musician), Austrian musician

See also
 Michael Greger (born 1972), American physician who promotes a plant-based diet